U.S. Route 219 (US 219) is a part of the U.S. Highway System that travels from Rich Creek, Virginia, to West Seneca, New York. In the U.S. state of West Virginia, the U.S. Highway travels from the Virginia state line near Peterstown to the Maryland state line near Silver Lake.

Route description

US 219 enters West Virginia in Peterstown at the split of US 219 and WV 12.  US 219 then heads northeast into Union.  US 219 continues through Greenbrier County running through the towns of Ronceverte, Lewisburg, where it intersects US 60, and Falling Spring.  US 219 continues north into Pocahontas County and through the towns of Hillsboro and Marlinton.  US 219 runs north into Randolph County and begins its dual certification with US 250.  They both serve the towns of Huttonsville, Mill Creek, Beverly, and Elkins, where US 33 joins the concurrency. US 219 splits from US 33 and US 250 just north of Elkins. US 219 continues through the town of Montrose until it enters Tucker County.  From here, US 219 runs through the towns of Parsons and Thomas.  US 219 heads north into rural Preston County and exits West Virginia into Garrett County, Maryland.

Major Intersections

References

U.S. Route 219
U.S. Route 219
U.S. Route 219
U.S. Route 219
U.S. Route 219
U.S. Route 219
U.S. Route 219
2 in West Virginia
19-2